Raffaella Camet Bertello (born September 14, 1992, in Lima, Peru) is a Peruvian volleyball player who plays for the Peru national team.

Career

Volleyball

2013-present: Senior team
On 2013, Raffaella was promoted to the starting line-up of the senior team for the 2013 Pan-American Cup. Rafaella was Peru's best scorer for the tournament.

Model work and sponsorships

2009-2011: Minor modeling and national campaigns
After the success of her junior team in international competitions, Raffaella signed as the face of Inca Kola.

2012-present: Red Bull and Volley Barrio
In 2012, Rafaella signed with Red Bull to be the face of the "Gives you wings" campaign in South America and Europe.

As part of the Red Bull campaigns, in April 2013 Raffaella Camet alongside fellow Peruvian volleyball player Maguilaura Frias participated in the first Red Bull Volley Barrio in South America that was held in the Peruvian cities of Trujillo, Arequipa and Lima, a tournament in which neighborhoods play "street volleyball" with a monetary prize.

Raffaella was the lead in a Webseries about the event called "Volley Barrio, Defend your little country"

Clubs
  Sporting Cristal (2009-2013)

Awards

National Team
 2013 Bolivarian Games -  Gold medal
 2013 South American Championship -  Bronze medal

Junior Team
 2010 Junior South American Championship -  Silver Medal
 2010 Youth Olympic Games -  Bronze medal
 2011 Junior Pan-American Cup -  Gold medal

Clubs
 2012-13 LNSV -  Third Place with Sporting Cristal

References

1992 births
Living people
Sportspeople from Lima
Peruvian people of French descent
Peruvian people of Italian descent
Volleyball players at the 2010 Summer Youth Olympics
Peruvian women's volleyball players
Universidad San Ignacio de Loyola alumni
21st-century Peruvian women